The men's javelin throw event at the 1988 Summer Olympics in Seoul, South Korea had an entry list of 38 competitors, with two qualifying groups (38 throwers) before the final (12) took place on Sunday September 25, 1988. This was the first time that the competitors had to use the new javelin. The qualification mark was set at 79.00 metres.

Medalists

Schedule
All times are Korea Standard Time (UTC+9)

Abbreviations
All results shown are in metres

Records

Qualification

Group A

Group B

Final

See also
 1984 Men's Olympic Javelin Throw (Los Angeles)
 1987 Men's World Championships Javelin Throw (Rome)
 1988 Javelin Throw Year Ranking
 1990 Men's European Championships Javelin Throw (Split)
 1991 Men's World Championships Javelin Throw (Tokyo)
 1992 Men's Olympic Javelin Throw (Barcelona)

References

External links
  Official Report
  koti.welho

J
Javelin throw at the Olympics
Men's events at the 1988 Summer Olympics